The American Mills Web Shop is a historic industrial complex at Orange Avenue and Front Street in West Haven, Connecticut.  Developed between 1903 and 1914, it is a good example of industrial development of the period.  The complex was listed on the National Register of Historic Places in 1983.

Description and history
The American Mills Web Shop is located in West Haven's northeastern Allingtown section, extending east and south at the junction of Front Street and Orange Avenue (United States Route 1).  The principal elements of the complex are a large weave shed, a single story structure extending along Front Street, and the administrative building, which faces Orange Avenue and is two stories in height.  A smokestack and boiler room are located behind these buildings; a more extensive set of outbuildings once also occupied the roughly  parcel, but have been demolished.  The weave shed has a particularly well-preserved sawtooth roof, a period innovation that brought daylight to the interiors of large industrial spaces.

The complex was begun in 1903 by the Narrow Fabrics Company, which specialized in manufacturing elastic fabrics used in applications such as industrial machine belts, zipper backings, brake linings, and automotive safety belts.  The company grew rapidly, enlarging the plant substantially in 1909 and 1914.  In 1914, a series of corporate mergers was accompanied by a name change to the American Mills Web Company.  It remained in operation until 1970, and underwent rehabilitation for other uses in the early 1980s.

See also
National Register of Historic Places listings in New Haven County, Connecticut

References

		
National Register of Historic Places in New Haven County, Connecticut
Italianate architecture in Connecticut
Buildings and structures completed in 1903
West Haven, Connecticut